Srichand Parmanand Hinduja (born 28 November 1935) is an Indian-born British billionaire businessman, investor, and philanthropist. He is the primary shareholder and chairman of Hinduja Group of companies. As of May 2020, together with his brother Gopichand he is the UK's richest man. Since the 1990s, he has been consistently ranked among the UK and Asia's wealthiest people. In 2022, Hinduja topped the Sunday Times Rich List with an estimated wealth of £28.472 billion sterling. Based on the rich list compiled by Asian Media & Marketing Group, Hinduja's wealth is estimated at £25.2 billion (US$31.7 billion). The Forbes List in March 2019 ranked him and his brother Gopichand as the world's 65th richest billionaire family with an estimated wealth of $16.9 billion.

Early life
Srichand Parmanand Hinduja was born on 28 November 1935 in Karachi, Sindh province, British India. He is the second son of Parmanand Deepchand Hinduja and Jamuna Parmanand Hinduja. He was educated at Davar's College of Commerce and R. D. National College, both in Mumbai.

Alongside his younger brothers Gopichand, Prakash and Ashok, Hinduja is known as the patriarch of India's "fab four".

Early business career 

Hinduja began his career in his father's textile and trading businesses in Bombay, India, and Tehran, Iran. His successful businesses in his early career included the sale of food commodities (onions and potatoes) and iron ore from India to Iran.

Business career 1980–2000s 

With the acquisition of Ashok Leyland (from British Leyland) and Gulf Oil (from Chevron) in the 1980s and the establishment of banks in Switzerland and India in the 1990s, Hinduja became one of India's best known business tycoons alongside such names as Tata, Birla, and Ambani. In 2012, the Group acquired the US firm Houghton International, the world's largest metal fluids manufacturer, for $1.045 billion forming a consortium with the help of Ghouse Mohammed Asif, JP Morgan ( Director of Private Equity ) and Hank Paulson , Former United States Secretary of the Treasury ( Ex - Goldman Sachs ) .

Business approach 

Hinduja's business approach is conservative and opportunistic, investing in diversified business sectors ranging from oil & gas, banking & finance, and IT to real estate, energy & chemicals, power, and media & entertainment.

Wealth
In 2022, Hinduja was the UK's wealthiest person, with an estimated wealth of £28.5 billion according to the Sunday Times Rich List.

As of March 2019, Forbes ranks SP and GP Hinduja as the 65th richest in the world, with a net worth of $16.9 billion, with Forbes India estimating his net worth at $18 billion. This makes him the 4th wealthiest Indian-origin business magnate in the world.

The October 2013 issue of Forbes Life estimates the Hinduja home in London's Carlton House Terrace down the Mall from Buckingham Palace to be worth $500 million, making it the third most expensive private home in the world.

In 2001, Hinduja was involved in the UK’s "cash-for-passports" scandal, where he donated money for the Millennium Dome while applying for British citizenship, leading to resignation of Peter Mandelson.

Personal life
Hinduja is married to Madhu Srichand Hinduja, and they have two daughters. Hinduja is a Sindhi Hindu.

In 1988, their daughter Shanu Srichand Hinduja married Suren Mukhi, the son of Narsi and Janki Mukhi, another London-based Sindhi trading family.

Their other daughter, Vinoo Srichand Hinduja is on the board of management for the P.D. Hinduja National Hospital and Medical Research Centre in Mumbai.

On 19 May 1992, their only son, Dharam Hinduja, died a few days after receiving 70% burns from self-immolation in a hotel room in Mauritius, as part of a suicide pact with his wife, who survived. He had secretly married Ninotchka Sargon, a Roman Catholic Australian, at Chelsea Register Office in January that year.

Hinduja is a teetotaler and a strict  vegetarian. He is known to bring his own vegetarian food to the Queen's banquets at Buckingham Palace.

His wife Madhu died in January 2023.

References

1935 births
Srichand
British billionaires
British businesspeople of Indian descent
Indian emigrants to England
British people of Indian descent
Living people
People from Shikarpur District
British people of Sindhi descent
People from Karachi